Houston is a city in Matanuska-Susitna Borough, Alaska, United States. It is part of the Anchorage, Alaska Metropolitan Statistical Area. It is located roughly 33 miles from downtown Anchorage, although it is a 58-mile drive by car between the two points. The population was 1,975 at the 2020 census, up from 1,912 in 2000.

Geography
Houston is located at  (61.608309, -149.773719).

Demographics

As of the census of 2000, there were 1,202 people, 445 households, and 292 families residing in the city. The racial makeup of the city was 84.03% White, 0.33% Black or African American, 8.24% Native American, 0.67% Asian, 0.33% Pacific Islander, 0.92% from other races, and 5.49% from two or more races. 2.33% of the population were Hispanic or Latino of any race.

There were 445 households, out of which 37.1% had children under the age of 18 living with them, 46.1% were married couples living together, 11.5% had a female householder with no husband present, and 34.2% were non-families. 26.1% of all households were made up of individuals, and 4.3% had someone living alone who was 65 years of age or older. The average household size was 2.70 and the average family size was 3.26.

In the city, the age distribution of the population shows 30.7% under the age of 18, 9.4% from 18 to 24, 31.2% from 25 to 44, 22.5% from 45 to 64, and 6.2% who were 65 years of age or older. The median age was 34 years. For every 100 females, there were 113.1 males. For every 100 females age 18 and over, there were 115.2 males.

The median income for a household in the city was $39,615, and the median income for a family was $46,818. Males had a median income of $45,000 versus $30,625 for females. The per capita income for the city was $17,213. About 13.1% of families and 17.1% of the population were below the poverty line, including 15.8% of those under age 18 and 7.4% of those age 65 or over.

History
Houston Siding was first listed on a blueprint map of the Alaska Railroad in 1917. Houston was incorporated as a fourth-class city in 1966. It remained an incorporated city after Alaska overhauled its local government structure in 1972, which saw the elimination of the fourth-class city designation and the dissolution of many cities so incorporated.

Also in 1972, George Boney, the chief justice of the Alaska Supreme Court and at the time the youngest chief justice of any U.S. state supreme court, died in Houston (at Cheri Lake) in a boating accident which resulted in drowning.

Property losses included 433 buildings and homes valued at $8.9 million.

Legal firework sales

Houston, Alaska is home to the Gorilla Fireworks Stand along its Parks Highway, providing a wide range of pyrotechnic explosions and products to the public. The city allows the sale of fireworks, which are prohibited throughout the Mat-Su Borough and Anchorage, and the sales taxes generated from those help pay for emergency services. These stands are the only place to purchase fireworks legally in Southcentral Alaska, and provide entertainment to many residents and visitors of the state. Taxes from fireworks sales at Houston's parks highway stands cover 10-15% of the city fire department's budget.

Fireworks buyers are charged a 2% sales tax, plus an additional 2% tax. This policy was approved by the voters of Houston in 2010, and was made permanent by the City Council. The additional tax was meant to “promote increased public safety”, and all the tax take goes to the fire department.

Cannabis legalization

In 2014, Alaska voters approved the legalization of recreational marijuana and its retail sale. However, local governments were given the right to ban commercial grow operations or pot sales within city limits. While Palmer and Wasilla originally banned marijuana sales and grow operations, Houston attempted to bolster its city revenues by allowing marijuana commerce. The mayor of Houston, Virgie Thompson, believed that cannabis excise and sales taxes could cover expenses for a new city police force.

Houston issued the first limited grow room license in the Matsu Valley to Lacey and Ron Bass in 2016. In 2021, marijuana tax revenue alone comprised over 33% of Houston's total collected taxes.

Notable people
 James Bondsteel (1947–1987), Medal of Honor recipient, lived in Houston until his death in 1987

See also
 List of cities in Alaska

References

External links

Anchorage metropolitan area
Cities in Alaska
Cities in Matanuska-Susitna Borough, Alaska